The 2022–23 Continental Cup was the 25th edition of the IIHF Continental Cup, Europe's second-tier ice hockey club competition organised by International Ice Hockey Federation. The season began on 23 September 2022 and the final tournament was played from 13 to 15 January 2023.

HK Nitra won the tournament for the first time thus becoming the fifth Slovak team in history to win the trophy.

For the first time since the 2014–15 season, the IIHF Continental Cup winners did not get a wild card spot for the next season of the Champions Hockey League due to the reduction in the number of teams participating in the latter beginning from the 2023–24 season.

Qualified teams

Notes

First round

Group A
The Group A tournament was played in Sofia, Bulgaria, from 23 to 25 September 2022.

All times are local (UTC+3).

Group B
The Group B tournament was played in Istanbul, Turkey, from 23 to 25 September 2022.

All times are local (UTC+3).

Second round

Group C
The Group C tournament was played in Angers, France, from 14 to 16 October 2022.

All times are local (UTC+2).

Group D
The Group D tournament was played in Asiago, Italy, from 14 to 16 October 2022.

All times are local (UTC+2).

Ranking of second-placed teams

Third round

Group E
The Group E tournament was played in Cardiff, Great Britain, from 18 to 20 November 2022.

All times are local (UTC±0).

Group F
The Group F tournament was played in Nitra, Slovakia, from 18 to 20 November 2022.

All times are local (UTC+1).

Final round
The final tournament was played in Angers, France, from 13 to 15 January 2023.

All times are local (UTC+1).

See also
 2022–23 Champions Hockey League

References

IIHF Continental Cup
2022–23 in European ice hockey